Fresh Air is a 1999 Australian film.

It was one of a series of "million dollar movies" financed by the Australian Film Commission and SBS Independent.

Cast
Marin Mimica as Jack
Nadine Garner as Kit
Bridie Carter as E
Simon Lyndon as Harrison
Tony Barry as Bob
Julie Hamilton as Joan

Production
Mansfield was working at Film Australia and working on the script. It began as a purely visual comedy, "then I started working in dialogue and it took off from there," said Mansfield. "In the final stages of development, we worked on bridging the kitchen sink drama with the observational comedy."

Mansfield showed the script to Rosemary Blight who liked it and decided to produce it. "I first read it on the bus between Broadway and Newtown," Blight said, "and I couldn’t stop laughing. It was very observant of people – in fact, some of the characters seemed to be on the same bus with me… He’s very observant…his view of the world is very different. In other scripts, you see people larger than life, but he sees them as they are."

Mansfield wrote 12 drafts of the script. It eventually got some finance through the New Screenwriters Scheme of the NSW Film and TV Office, through which Bill Bennett agreed to mentor Mansfield. Then the film attracted supportfrom Bridgit Ikin, head of SBS Independent, and Marion Pilowski, Head of Acquisitions and Program Development at Premium Movie Partnership (Foxtel) who supported the film's successful application to be one of the five "Million Dollar Movies" jointly financed by the Australian Film Commission and SBS Independent.

Shooting took five weeks, with six weeks of shooting the "zine" elements. Mansfield called the film "'zinema'... a wanky excuse for a cut and paste style. . . zine as in home made, non-profit sort of magazine. It’s expressionistic in style but naturalistic in content."

Cinematographer Toby Oliver said the film uses "wobblycam, and a fragmented jump cut style, but also some scenes are very static with no camera movement, or there may be an elaborate dolly set up. We are also using photos and words sprinkled through the film. "

References

External links

Fresh Air at Screen Australia

"Fresh Air" at Urban Cinefile

Fresh Air at SBS Movie Show
Fresh Air at Oz Movies

Australian comedy-drama films
1999 films

1990s English-language films
1990s Australian films